Barbara Mary Vernon (25 July 1916 – 16 April 1978) was an Australian playwright, screenwriter, editor and radio announcer.  
 
Her plays included The Passionate Pianist and The Multi-Coloured Umbrella.  
 
She was the head writer and script editor of the ABC TV drama series Bellbird, the longest such series produced by the ABC, she also wrote the film adaptation of that series entitled Country Town

Biography
Vernon was born on 25 July 1916, Inverell, New South Wales the youngest child of four to medical practitioner Murray Menzies Vernon and Constance Emma Elliot (née Barling). She attended the New England School in Armidale, New South Wales , before entering the Women's Auxiliary Australian Air Force in 1943, rising to rank of Corporal, before being discharged in 1946. She joined radio the Northern Broadcasters radio station radio 2NZ. Vernon started to write plays because she was involved with amateur drama and they could not afford to pay for the copyright of plays.

Her first play was "Naked Possum" in 1956, staged by Dame Doris Fitton,  her second professionally performed play was the award-winning "The Multi-Coloured Umbrella" and this was the first Australian play broadcast by Australian television. She retired in 1976 and died from a cardio in Darlinghurst, New South Wales on 16 April 1978 at St Vincents Hospital aged 61

Select Works
The Passionate Pianist (1957) – adapted for TV.
The Multi-Coloured Umbrella (1958) – adapted for TV in 1958
Bellbird (1967) – head writer, script editor
The Sleeping Planet (1968) – play
Pastures of the Blue Crane (1969) (TV series) – script editor
Lane End (TV series) (1972) – head writer, script editor
Certain Women- contribution's as editor (unknown episodes)

References

External links

Biography at Australian Dictionary of Biography
Complete TV script Fireflies at National Archives of Australia
Complete script King Tide Running at National Archives of Australia

Australian dramatists and playwrights
1916 births
1978 deaths
Australian Anglicans
Royal Australian Air Force personnel of World War II
20th-century Australian women
Royal Australian Air Force airmen
Women in the Australian military
Women in World War II
Military personnel from New South Wales